Geranium molle, the Dove's-foot Crane's-bill or Dovesfoot Geranium, is an annual herbaceous plant of the family Geraniaceae.

Description 
Geranium molle is a small plant reaching on average  in height. It is a very branched plant, quite hairy, with several ascending stems. The leaves are palmate, cut 5 to 9 times. The flowers are pinkish-purple, 8–12 mm in diameter, with very jagged petals. It blooms from April to September. The flowers are hermaphrodite and mainly pollinated by Hymenoptera. Fruits are glabrous, usually with 6-9 transverse ridges.

Synonyms

Distribution and habitat
It is native to the Mediterranean and sub-Mediterranean areas, but has naturalized in other parts of Europe, in southwestern and central  Asia and in North Africa, though it may have already been in those parts and areas, just not properly identified. It is considered an introduced species in North America, where it is known as Dovefoot Geranium or Awnless Geranium. Although non-native in parts of its range, this species poses little threat to native ecosystems.

It is found in dry meadows, hedges, banks and forest edges.

Herbal medicine
Nicholas Culpeper in his herbal of 1652 suggested a variety of uses for G. molle, including the treatment of internal and external injuries. A note was made that the bruised leaf healed external injuries faster. A decoction in wine was said to relieve gout and other joint pains.

Gallery

References

External links

Universiteit Leuven Photo gallery
Jepson Manual Treatment
U.C. Photo gallery
Geranium molle Flowers in Israel

molle
Flora of Europe
Flora of the United Kingdom
Flora of Lebanon
Plants described in 1753
Taxa named by Carl Linnaeus